{{DISPLAYTITLE:C17H14N2O2}}
The molecular formula C17H14N2O2 (molar mass: 278.305 g/mol, exact mass: 278.1055 u) may refer to:

 Bimakalim
 Sudan Red G

Molecular formulas